is a Japanese actress. She is known for her starring role as Saeko Matsumiya in Son of Godzilla.

Biography
Maeda is born to an American father and a Japanese mother.

Selected filmography

Film 
 The Face of Another (1966) as Singer in Bar
 Let's Go, Young Guy! (1967) as Etsuko
 Judo Champion (1967) as Minako Arita
 Son of Godzilla (1967) as Saeko Matsumiya
 Hyappatsu hyakuchû: Ôgon no me (1968)
 Kigeki ekimae kazan (1968)
 McDull's Kung Fu Yochien (2012) as Mrs. McDull
 McDull's Kung Fu Yochien (2012) as Mrs. McDull
Endless SHOCK (2021) as Owner role

TV
Serial TV novel Beppin-san (November 28, 2016-, NHK)-When child role
Aino Mating Agency (July-September 2017, TV Asahi)-Ikue Toshino
Sunday Prime " Funny Detective 20" (June 16, 2019, TV Asahi)-As Mutsumi Kawasumi

Awards 
 February 2009 - Jeans Fifty Grand Prize: Special Award
 March 2009 - The 30th Matsuo Performing Arts Awards: Excellence Award

Notes

References

External links 

 

Living people
1948 births
Japanese actresses
People from Kamakura